is a coming of age manga, based on the board game Go, written by Yumi Hotta and illustrated by Takeshi Obata. The series was published by Shueisha in its Weekly Shōnen Jump magazine from 1999 to 2003, with the 189 chapters collected into 23 tankōbon volumes.

The series was adapted into a 75-episode anime television series by Studio Pierrot, which was broadcast between 2001 and 2003 on TV Tokyo.



Chapters and volumes

References

External links

 
 

Hikaru no Go